Martin Buck FRS is a British microbiologist.
He is a professor at Imperial College, London. Studied at Royal Holloway, University of London

References

External links
http://www3.imperial.ac.uk/newsandeventspggrp/imperialcollege/newssummary/news_22-5-2009-11-51-2
http://www.bio.ic.ac.uk/research/mbuck/mbuck.htm
http://royalsociety.tv/rsPlayer.aspx?presentationid=434

British microbiologists
Academics of Imperial College London
Alumni of Bedford College, London
Fellows of the Royal Society
Living people
Year of birth missing (living people)